1920s Investigators' Companion is a role-playing game supplement for Call of Cthulhu by Keith Herber, published by Chaosium. Volume 1 was published in 1993, volume 2 in 1994. An updated single volume of The 1920s Investigator's Companion was published in 1997.

Contents
Because modern game players may not know much about the early part of the twentieth century, 1920s Investigators' Companion contains basic information on the 1920s. The book covers economic and social background, popular culture, research facilities, transportation, and equipment that would be available to 1920 investigators.

Reception
In the October 1994 edition of Dragon (Issue 210), Rick Swan was impressed by the large volume of facts and figures, but questioned the book's usefulness, saying "Is the Companion interesting? Yep. Impressive? You bet. Useful? Well, you tell me — when was the last time you needed to know the horsepower of a Pierce-Arrow?" Swan concluded by giving the book an average rating of 3 out of 6, commenting, "This is mostly window dressing, helpful for spicing up a referee's descriptions, but unnecessary for players."

Review
The Unspeakable Oath #10 (Fall, 1993)
White Wolf #49 (Nov., 1994)
Dragon #248 (June 1998)
Backstab #7
Magia i Miecz #51 (March 1998) (Polish)

References

External links 
 

Call of Cthulhu (role-playing game) supplements
Role-playing game supplements introduced in 1993